Park Woo (born 25 October 1972) is a South Korean wrestler. He competed in the men's Greco-Roman 97 kg at the 2000 Summer Olympics.

References

1972 births
Living people
South Korean male sport wrestlers
Olympic wrestlers of South Korea
Wrestlers at the 2000 Summer Olympics
Place of birth missing (living people)
Wrestlers at the 1998 Asian Games
Asian Games medalists in wrestling
Asian Games bronze medalists for South Korea
Medalists at the 1998 Asian Games
20th-century South Korean people
21st-century South Korean people